The 1969 Canadian Open was a tennis tournament played on outdoor clay courts at the Toronto Lawn Tennis Club in Toronto in Canada. The men's tournament was held from August 9 through August 15, 1969, while the women's tournament was played from August 16 through August 23, 1969.

Finals

Men's singles
 Cliff Richey defeated  Butch Buchholz 6–4, 5–7, 6–4, 6–0
 It was Richey's 2nd professional title of the year and the 2nd of his career.

Women's singles
 Faye Urban defeated  Vicki Berner 6–2, 6–0
 It was Urban's 1st title of the year and the 1st of her career.

Men's doubles
 Ron Holmberg /  John Newcombe defeated  Butch Buchholz /  Raymond Moore 6–3, 6–4 
 It was Holmberg's 1st professional title of the year and the 1st of his career. It was Newcombe's 6th title of the year and the 9th of his professional career.

Women's doubles
 Vicki Berner /  Faye Urban defeated  Jane O'Hara Wood /  Vivienne Strong 6–1, 6–1
 It was Nunns' 1st title of the year and the 1st of her career. It was Urban's 2nd title of the year and the 2nd of her career.

References

External links
 
 Association of Tennis Professionals (ATP) tournament profile
 Women's Tennis Association (WTA) tournament profile

Canadian Open
Canadian Open (Tennis)
Canadian Open (tennis)